Eduard Ernst Bätke (also spelled Bätge; 10 July 1849 – 29 December 1920) was a Baltic German politician who was the deputy mayor of Reval (now Tallinn) from July 1894 to April 1895. He was a member of Reval's city council from 1882 to 1905, and was also the president of the Municipal Government Gas, Waterworks, and Promenades Commission. He was later, from 1886 to 1897, a deputy head of the city. He was elected to be the mayor of Reval in 1894, but was not confirmed for office; instead, he served as deputy mayor from July 1894 to April 1895. He was succeeded by Karl Johann von Hueck.

See also
 List of mayors of Tallinn

References

1849 births
1920 deaths
Politicians from Tallinn
People from Kreis Harrien
Baltic-German people
Mayors of Tallinn